Centerview Township is an inactive township in Johnson County, in the U.S. state of Missouri.

Centerview Township was established in 1870, taking its name from the community of Centerview, Missouri.

References

Townships in Missouri
Townships in Johnson County, Missouri